The St. Riquier Gospels is an illuminated Gospel Book made during the Carolingian Renaissance.  It was given to Angilbert, abbot of the monastery of Saint Riquier at Centula by Charlemagne.  It is a member of the Ada group of manuscripts, which includes the Ada Gospels.

References
De Hamel, Christopher. A History of Illuminated Manuscripts. Boston: David R. Godine, 1986, p. 46.

Gospel Books
9th-century illuminated manuscripts
Carolingian illuminated manuscripts
Abbeville
Purple parchment